Luxury Problems may refer to:

 Luxury Problems (Patrick Duff album)
 Luxury Problems (Andy Stott album)
 ''Luxury Problem, a 1999 album by Lunachicks